Cigarettes are small rolls of finely cut tobacco leaves wrapped in a cylinder of thin paper for smoking.

Cigarettes may also refer to:

 "Cigarettes" (song), by Juice Wrld, 2022
 "Cigarettes", a song by Tash Sultana from the 2018 album Flow State
 "Cigarettes", a song by Reks from Rhythmatic Eternal King Supreme

See also
 Cigarette (disambiguation)